"Hunter's Moon" is a song by Swedish rock band Ghost. It was released on 30 September 2021 in support of the 2021 slasher film Halloween Kills; although it does not feature on the film's soundtrack, it plays over the end credits. A music video for the song was released the same day. On 20 January 2022, the band announced that the song was confirmed to be featured on their fifth studio album, Impera, which was released on 11 March 2022.

Two versions of the song were recorded. The single version, released on 30 September 2021, was produced by Klas Åhlund and mixed by Andy Wallace, while a version featured in the end credits of Halloween Kills was produced by Rob Cavallo and Tom Dalgety and mixed by Doug McKean.

A 7" vinyl record containing the song and "Halloween Kills Main Title" was released alongside a limited edition orange 7" vinyl record on January 21, 2022. The latter release had both versions of "Hunter’s Moon".

Background 
According to Tobias Forge, Ryan Turek, a producer of the film Halloween Kills, asked him if he was interested in writing a song for the film. Forge said that he already had a few songs that might work, and specifically one song that could work very well within the concepts of the film.

Track listing

7" single

7" single (Halloween Kills orange vinyl)

Personnel

Ghost
 Papa Emeritus IV
 A Group of Nameless Ghouls

Additional personnel
 Fredrik Åkesson – guitar
 Hux Nettermalm – drums
 Martin Hederos – piano, organ

Production
 Klas Åhlund – producer (single version)
 Rob Cavallo – producer (movie version)
 Tom Dalgety – producer (movie version)
 Ted Jensen – mastering engineer
 Andy Wallace – mixing engineer (single version)
 Doug McKeen – mixing engineer (movie version)
 Martin Eriksson Sandmark – recording engineer
 Stefan Boman – recording engineer
 Dan Malsch – mixing assistant

Charts

Weekly charts

Year-end charts

References

2021 songs
2021 singles
Ghost (Swedish band) songs
Halloween (franchise) mass media
Loma Vista Recordings singles
Songs written by Tobias Forge